Marko Jaakko Tapani Wahlman (born 6 April 1969 in Pori) is a retired male hammer thrower from Finland. His personal best throw was 78.39 metres, which he achieved in July 1999 in Lappeenranta.

Achievements

References

sports-reference

1969 births
Living people
Sportspeople from Pori
Finnish male hammer throwers
UTEP Miners men's track and field athletes
Athletes (track and field) at the 1996 Summer Olympics
Olympic athletes of Finland